The Kaiserslautern Zoo (until 2003 ) is a zoo in the city of Kaiserslautern in Germany. The Zoo was founded on June 15, 1968, and is located in  Kaiserslautern's Siegelbach neighbourhood. The zoo originally belonged to the town of Siegelbach which became part of the city in 1969.

The Zoo is home to about 600 animals of over 100 species and currently covers  It is planned to be developed to

History of the Zoo 

In 2003, ownership was transferred from the city to a private company.

In 2005, the new monkey house was opened and a show with birds of prey established.

In 2011, a farm with pet animals (Altgermanischen Frankenhof) was established, as well as a rehabilitation center for white storcks.

See also 
 List of zoos in Germany

References

External links

 
 Kaiserslautern Zoo at Zoo-Infos.de (in English)

Zoos in Germany
Zoos established in 1968
Zoological Garden
Zoological Garden